Hymenopus coronatoides is a species of praying mantis that have been found in Jinghong County, Yunnan, China.

Etymology
The suffix "-ides" means literally 'son of', or, more generally, 'descendant of'. It usually has the meaning 'resembling a'. -o- is opten placed between components of composed words in Greek.

See also
List of mantis genera and species
Flower Mantis

References

Hymenopodidae
Mantodea of Asia
Endemic fauna of Yunnan
Insects of China
Insects described in 1994